Coon Creek Falls, is a  plunge waterfall which shares a plungepool with Fall Creek Falls.  The falls are not always present, depending on the amount of precipitation in the area.  The falls are located near Spencer, Tennessee in Fall Creek Falls State Park.

References

Waterfalls of Tennessee
Waterfalls of Van Buren County, Tennessee